A number of steamships were named President Madison, including -

 , an American ocean liner in service 1922–1938
 , an American ocean liner in service 1940–1942
 , an American ocean liner in service 1946–1972

See also 
 
 
 

Ship names